Fernando Pereira do Nascimento (born 17 December 1994), known as Fernando Sobral, is a Brazilian footballer who plays for Cuiabá as a midfielder.

Club career

Early career
Born in Sobral, Ceará, Sobral was a Guarany de Sobral youth graduate. He made his first team debut on 26 July 2012, coming on as a second-half substitute in a 3–0 Copa Fares Lopes home win against Ferroviário.

Sobral scored his first senior goal on 17 October 2013, netting the opener in a 1–1 away draw against the same opponent, also for the state cup. For the 2014 season, he joined Horizonte and was an undisputed starter during the Campeonato Cearense.

In the middle of 2014, Sobral was loaned to Série B side Icasa until the end of the year. He made his professional debut on 13 September, starting in a 1–1 home draw against Joinville; he contributed rarely as his side suffered relegation.

Ahead of the 2015 campaign, Sobral returned to hometown club Guarany, being again first-choice. On 20 March of that year he moved to Atlético Goianiense also in a temporary deal, but featured in only one match for the club.

On 22 January 2016, after a short stint at Floresta, Sobral signed for Fluminense de Feira, still owned by Horizonte. He returned to his parent club for the remainder of the season, but rejoined Flu in January 2017.

Sampaio Corrêa
On 8 May 2017, Sobral was announced at Sampaio Corrêa in the Série C. An immediate starter, he contributed with three goals as his side achieved promotion to the second division.

Sobral was also an undisputed first-choice during the 2018 campaign, winning the year's Copa do Nordeste.

Ceará
On 22 December 2018, Sobral agreed to a contract with Série A side Ceará. He made his top tier debut the following 28 April, replacing Ricardinho in a 4–0 home routing of CSA.

Cuiabá
On 8 December 2022, after Ceará's relegation, Sobral signed a four-year contract with Cuiabá in the top tier.

Career statistics

Honours
Icasa
Copa Fares Lopes: 2014

Sampaio Corrêa
Copa do Nordeste: 2018

Ceará
Copa do Nordeste: 2020

References

External links

1994 births
Living people
People from Sobral, Ceará
Sportspeople from Ceará
Brazilian footballers
Association football midfielders
Campeonato Brasileiro Série A players
Campeonato Brasileiro Série B players
Campeonato Brasileiro Série C players
Campeonato Brasileiro Série D players
Guarany Sporting Club players
Horizonte Futebol Clube players
Associação Desportiva Recreativa e Cultural Icasa players
Atlético Clube Goianiense players
Floresta Esporte Clube players
Fluminense de Feira Futebol Clube players
Sampaio Corrêa Futebol Clube players
Ceará Sporting Club players
Cuiabá Esporte Clube players